Kendall Blanton (born November 10, 1995) is an American football tight end for the Kansas City Chiefs of the National Football League (NFL). He played college football at Missouri. Blanton signed with the Los Angeles Rams as an undrafted free agent in 2019 and started in their Super Bowl LVI win.

College career
Blanton was a member of the Missouri Tigers for five seasons, redshirting as a true freshman. He finished his collegiate career with 44 receptions for 476 yards and six touchdowns in 43 games played.

Professional career

Los Angeles Rams

Blanton signed with the Los Angeles Rams as an undrafted free agent on April 29, 2019. He was waived on August 31, 2019, during final roster cuts, and was subsequently signed to the team's practice squad one day later. The Rams promoted Blanton to their active roster on December 3, 2019. He made his NFL debut on December 12, 2019, playing four snaps on special teams in a 28-12 win over the Seattle Seahawks.

Blanton was waived at the end of training camp on September 5, 2020. He was re-signed back to the Rams' practice squad on September 6, 2020, where he spent the entirety of the 2020 season. Blanton signed a reserve/futures contract with the Rams on January 19, 2021. He was waived during final roster cuts and again re-signed to the Rams practice squad to start the 2021 season. Blanton was elevated to the active roster on October 24, 2021, for the team's Week 7 game against the Detroit Lions. He was signed to the active roster on October 30. 

On January 23, 2022, Blanton scored his first NFL touchdown in the Rams' divisional playoff victory over the Tampa Bay Buccaneers. Blanton got to start in Super Bowl LVI for the injured Tyler Higbee, but suffered a shoulder injury in the first half before he could record any statistics. Blanton was waived on August 20, 2022.

Washington Commanders
Blanton was claimed off waivers by the Washington Commanders on August 22, 2022. He was released on August 30.

Kansas City Chiefs
On September 1, 2022, Blanton was signed to the Kansas City Chiefs practice squad.

Los Angeles Rams (second stint)
On September 22, 2022, Blanton was signed to the Los Angeles Rams active roster off the Chiefs practice squad. He was waived on November 8, 2022. He was re-signed to the practice squad two days later. His practice squad contract was terminated twelve days later.

Kansas City Chiefs (second stint)
On November 23, 2022, Blanton signed with the practice squad of the Kansas City Chiefs. Blanton won his second straight Super Bowl ring when the Chiefs defeated the Philadelphia Eagles in Super Bowl LVII. He signed a reserve/future contract on February 15, 2023.

Personal life
Blanton is a Christian. Blanton's father, Jerry Blanton, played linebacker for the Kansas City Chiefs for seven seasons.

References

External links
Missouri Tigers bio

1995 births
Living people
American football tight ends
Kansas City Chiefs players
Los Angeles Rams players
Missouri Tigers football players
People from Blue Springs, Missouri
Players of American football from Missouri
Washington Commanders players